The Ukrainian Latin alphabet (Ukrainian: Українська латиниця, tr. Ukrainska latynytsia or Латинка, tr. Latynka) is the form of the Latin script used for writing, transliteration and retransliteration of Ukrainian.

The Latin alphabet has been proposed or imposed several times in the history in Ukraine, but it has so far never toppled the dominance of the conventional Cyrillic Ukrainian alphabet.

Characteristics

The Ukrainian literary language has been written with the Cyrillic script in a tradition going back to the introduction of Christianity and the Old Church Slavonic language to Kievan Rus’.  Proposals for Latinization, if not imposed for outright political reasons, have always been politically charged, and have never been generally accepted, although some proposals to create an official Latin alphabet for Ukrainian language have been expressed lately by national intelligentsia. Technically, most have resembled the linguistically related Polish and Czech alphabets.

While superficially similar to a Latin alphabet, transliteration of Ukrainian from Cyrillic into the Latin script (or romanization) is usually not intended for native speakers, and may be designed for certain academic requirements or technical constraints. See romanization of Ukrainian.

The Mozilla Add-ons website published the Ukrajinsjka Latynka extension to transliterate Ukrainian texts from Cyrillic to Latin script on web pages.

History 

Ukrainian was occasionally written in the Latin script as far back as the sixteenth and seventeenth centuries, in publications using the Polish and Czech alphabets.

19th century 

In the nineteenth century, there were attempts to introduce the Latin script into Ukrainian writing, by J. Lozinskiy, a Ukrainian scholar and priest from Lviv (Josyp Łozyński Ivanovyč, Ruskoje wesile, 1834), Tomasz Padura, and other Polish-Ukrainian romantic poets.

The use of the Latin script for Ukrainian was promoted by authorities in Galicia under the Austrian Habsburg Empire. Franz Miklosich developed a Latin alphabet for Ukrainian in 1852, based on the Polish and Czech alphabets (adopting Czech č, š, ž, dž, ď, ť, Polish ś, ź, ć, ń, and ľ following the same pattern). Czech politician Josef Jireček took an interest in this concept, and managed to gain support for the project in the Imperial Ministry of Interior. 

As part of a Polonization campaign in Galicia during the period of neo-absolutist rule after 1849, Viceroy Agenor Gołuchowski attempted to impose this Latin alphabet on Ukrainian publications in 1859. This started a fierce publicly debated Alphabetical War, and in the end the Latin alphabet was rejected. Ukrainian books continued to be published in Cyrillic, while the Latin alphabet was used in special editions "for those who read Polish only" in Galicia, Podlaskie, and the Chełm region.

A Latin alphabet for Ukrainian publications was also imposed in Romanian Bessarabia, Bukovina and Dobrudja, Hungarian Zakarpattia. It was also used by immigrants from these regions in the United States.

In Ukraine under the Russian Empire, Mykhailo Drahomanov promoted a purely phonemic Cyrillic alphabet (the Drahomanivka) including the Latin letter ј in 1876, replacing the digraphs я, є, ю, ї with ја, је, ју, јі, similar to the earlier Karadžić reform of the Serbian alphabet. The Ems Ukaz banning Ukrainian-language publication doomed this reform to obscurity.

20th century 
In Soviet Ukraine, during the 1927 orthographical conference in Kharkiv, linguists Maik Yohansen, Borys Tkachenko, and Mykola Nakonechnyi proposed the application of the more "international" Latin script to Ukrainian, but the idea was opposed by Soviet government representatives. Later, Vasyl Simovych was a proponent of the Latin script during the tentative Latinization in the USSR.

21st century

Ukrainian National transliteration 

This is the official transliteration system of Ukraine, also employed by the United Nations and many countries' foreign services. It is currently widely used to represent Ukrainian geographic names and for personal names in passports. It is based on English orthography, and requires only ASCII characters with no diacritics. It can be considered a variant of the "modified Library of Congress system", but does not simplify the -ий and -ій endings.

The first version of the system was codified in Decision No. 9 of the Ukrainian Committee on Issues of Legal Terminology on April 19, 1996, stating that the system is binding for the transliteration of Ukrainian names in English in legislative and official acts.

The current 2010 version is used for transliterating all proper names and was approved as Resolution 55 of the Cabinet of Ministers of Ukraine, on January 27, 2010. This modified earlier laws and brought together a unified system for official documents, publication of cartographic works, signs and indicators of inhabited localities, streets, stops, subway stations, etc.

It has been adopted internationally. The 27th session of the UN Group of Experts on Geographical Names (UNGEGN) held in New York 30 July and 10 August 2012 approved the Ukrainian system of romanization. The BGN/PCGN jointly adopted the system in 2020.

Official geographic names are romanized directly from the original Ukrainian and not translated. For example, Kyivska oblast not Kyiv Oblast, Pivnichnokrymskyi kanal not North Crimean Canal.

DSTU 9112:2021 

On 1 April 2022, the "Cyrillic-Latin transliteration and Latin-Cyrillic retransliteration of Ukrainian texts. Writing rules" (SSOU 9112:2021) was approved as State Standard of Ukraine. The standard is based on modified ISO 9:1995 standard and was developed by the Technical Committee 144 "Information and Documentation" of the State Scientific and Technical Library of Ukraine. According to the SSTL, it could be used in future cooperation between the European Union and Ukraine, in which "Ukrainian will soon, along with other European languages, take its rightful place in multilingual natural language processing scenarios, including machine translation."

Variations

Abecadło 

Some letters borrowed from Polish were used in the Ukrainian Łatynka as stated above, which also has a close resemblance to the Belarusian Łacinka. Although never broadly accepted, it was used mostly by Ukrainians living in territories near Poland (where it was called Abecadło). The orthography is explained in Łatynycia, a western Ukrainian publication of the 1900s.

As example, the Introduction of Josyp Łozynśkyj's Ruskoje Wesile ('Ruthenian Wedding', 1834):

 Perédmowa
 W tym opysi skazuju, jaksia wesile po sełach meży prostym ruskim ludom widprawlaje. Ne mohu jednako utrymowaty, jakoby toj sposób wesile widprawlaty wsiude newidminni był zachowanym; bo hdenekodyj szczoś dodajut, hdeinde szczoś wypuskajut, a znowu hdeinde szczoś widminiajut. Syła w mojej syli było, starał-jemsia w rozmaitych misciach obradki i pisny ruskoho wesila póznaty i pérekonał-jemsia że prynajmni szczo do hołownych obradkiw i pisnéj wsiude tymże samym sposobom wesilesia widprawlaje. I toj sposób opysałjem w nynijszуj knyżoczci dodajuczy jednako hdenekodyj i miscowyi widminy. Moim najperszym i najbohatszym a nawet́ i nihdy newyczerpanym źridłom, z kotorohom tyi widomosty czerpał, było dopytowanie po sełach tych ludej, kotryi czasto na wesilach bywały i wesilnyi uŕady pistowały. Nykotorych obradkiw był jem sam okozritelnym świdkom.

Jireček's project 

Josef Jireček proposed an alphabet based more closely on Czech orthography (except some letters like ć, ń, ś, ź).

 For є which is used in place of Old Church Slavonic ѧ or Polish ę (e.g. sěhnuty, děkovaly, ščěstje, devěť). 
 For л in old Slavic ъl + cons. (e.g. vołk). Jireček mistakenly believed there are three types of L in Ukrainian – hard (hart) l, soft (erweicht) ľ and potentiated hard (potenziert hart) ł. 
 For і, which derives from Old Church Slavonic о (as Jireček distinguished і < о and і < е, ѣ; e.g. кість - küsť, гвіздь - hvüźď).
 In foreign words only.

Modern versions 

In modern Ukraine, use of Latin alphabets for the Ukrainian language is very rare. However, discussions of a united format of Latynka and its status still continue. The most popular modern versions are Luchukivka (based on Czech orthography close to Jireček's project and presented by Ivan Luchuk) and Ukrainian Gajica (based on Croatian orthography). In western Ukraine, the Abecadło alphabet is also used, but to a lesser extent than Luchukivka.

Since Ukraine's independence in 1991, the country began to use only characters that occur in both the Cyrillic and the Latin alphabet for vehicle registration plates: A, B, E, I, K, M, H, O, P, C, T, X.

Comparison 
Comparison of several romanization systems for Ukrainian and historical versions of Ukrainian Latin alphabet in example of the State Anthem of Ukraine.

Official Ukrainian romanization systems

Non-Ukrainian romanization systems

Historical Latin Alphabets

Gallery

Notes

See also 

 Romanization of Ukrainian
 Belarusian Latin alphabet
 Russian Latin alphabet
 Latinisation (USSR)

References 

 Chornovol, Ihor (2001), "Latynka v ukrayins’komu pravopysi: retrospektyva i perspektyva" (The Latin script in Ukrainian orthography: retrospective and perspective), in Ji, no 23.  (in Ukrainian, PDF)
 
 Ruthenian Wedding Sample Text 

Contemporary literature concerning the Alphabet Wars:
 Markijan Szaszkewicz. Azbuka i abecadło (1836). Przemyśl.
 Ivan Franko. Азбучна війна в Галичині 1859 – 'The Alphabet War in Galicia 1859'.
 J. Łewićki (1834). Review of the Introduction of the Polish Alphabet to Ruthenian Writing.
 Josyp Lozynskyj (1834). "On the Introduction of the Polish Alphabet to Ruthenian (Ukrainian) Writing", «О wprowadzeniu abecadła polskiego do pismiennictwa ruskiego».
 M. Šaškevyč. Азбука і abecadło.

External links 
 
 Latynka's Orthography
 Alphabet War in the Encyclopedia of Ukraine
 Latynka transcriber (scroll to bottom of page) which transcribes Ukrainian into Latynka
 Online romanizer of Ukrainian texts and websites
 Ukraïnśka Latynka Browser Extension — automatic transliteration of web pages, provides several romanization tables and a rule editor

Ukrainian orthography
Latin alphabets